The Kingborough Sports Centre (KSC), is a multi-purpose sports venue located in the southern Hobart (Tasmania) suburb of Kingston. The centre was opened on 19 May 1979 and since opening has become a vital part of the Kingborough Community.

After the centre was opened it became the area's main venue for indoor sports such as volleyball, basketball and netball. In 1983 Australia's National Basketball League expanded in its 5th season to include the newly formed Hobart Devils who chose the Kingborough Sports Centre as their home stadium. The Devils regularly played in front of packed houses at Kingborough despite the team's lack of success and a feature of their games was the court, which like any community based sports centre not only had the outline of the basketball court but players and officials had to contend with the markings from sports such as netball, volleyball and badminton as well.

The Devils remained at the 1,800 capacity Kingborough until the end of the 1988 NBL season, during which time it became increasingly obvious that a larger venue would be needed to cater for the increased crowds the NBL was seeing at the time. The problem for the Devils was solved when the 5,400 seat Derwent Entertainment Centre opened in 1989. The Hobart Devils, after a six-year run at the KSC moved 16 km north into the heart of Hobart and the centre reverted to being a community based sports centre.

Future Development 
The Kingborough Sports Centre plans to make an aquatic centre/swimming pool

References

External links
Kingborough Sports Centre - Official Site

Hobart Devils
Defunct National Basketball League (Australia) venues
Basketball venues in Australia
Music venues in Australia
Sports venues in Hobart
Landmarks in Hobart
Culture in Hobart
Kingston, Tasmania